Château d'Aiguèze is a castle in Aiguèze, Gard, France. It was built on the top of a cliff over the Ardèche river.

References 

Aigueze